New York State Route 298 (NY 298) is an east–west state highway located entirely within Onondaga County, New York, in the United States. Along its course it has exits with all four Interstate Highways in the area. Most of NY 298 was originally designated as part of NY 91 in 1930 before gaining its current designation later in the decade.

Route description
Most of NY 298 is maintained by the New York State Department of Transportation (NYSDOT); however, one section in Syracuse—from the junction of Bear Street and Genant Drive to the eastern city line—is city-maintained.

City of Syracuse
NY 298 begins just west of downtown Syracuse, where it splits from I-690 at exit 9, a partial interchange providing same-direction connections only. It heads northeast as Bear Street, passing by several commercial and industrial blocks as it crosses over Onondaga Creek, which flows into nearby Onondaga Lake. After four large blocks, NY 298 meets I-81 at exit 22. The route leaves Bear Street here to follow a southeastward track on Genant Drive and Sunset Avenue, which form a one-way couplet in the vicinity of I-81. NY 298 eastbound follows the former along I-81's southwestern edge, while westbound traffic is routed along the latter on the freeway's northeastern side. This stretch of NY 298 provides access from I-690 eastbound to I-81 northbound, one connection missing at the two freeways' interchange in downtown.

The couplet lasts for just two blocks to Court Street, where both directions of NY 298 turn north to enter a more residential area of the city. Just two blocks north of I-81 at North Salina Street, NY 298 intersects with U.S. Route 11 (US 11), which closely parallels I-81 as it runs through Syracuse. From here, the route slowly curves to take a more easterly course through the residential northern portion of the city. It seamlessly crosses into the town of Salina, eventually completing the eastern turn as it heads through the town. The homes begin to give way to businesses and industrial areas at the hamlet of Lyncourt, where NY 298 becomes a four-lane divided highway and connects to the north end of NY 598. From here, NY 298 heads northeast, losing the Court Street name as it passes under the CSX Transportation-owned Mohawk Subdivision and crosses into the town of DeWitt.

Past the railroad overpass, NY 298 enters a heavily industrial area, where it serves industrial parks on both sides of the highway. It connects to Townline Road by way of a traffic circle known locally as Military Circle, from where the road heads due east to a larger traffic circle named Carrier Circle. The circle is one of two in the state that directly connects to an exit on the New York State Thruway (I-90), here exit 35. NY 635 comes in from the south here as well via Thompson Road, terminating inside of the circle. East of the circle, NY 298 turns northward on a long arc, serving a handful of smaller industrial parks before crossing over the Thruway as Kinne Street.

Northeastern Onondaga County

The suburbs slowly begin to taper off north of the Thruway, where NY 298 becomes Collamer Road after Kinne Street leaves at a northeastern turn in the route. It narrows back into a two-lane undivided highway and proceeds through the pockets of residential and commercial development that comprise the hamlet of Collamer on its way to an interchange with I-481 at exit 7. After the I-481 junction, it heads east yet slightly northwards into the town of Manlius, where the dense commercial and residential areas give way to more rural regions with only a handful of homes. NY 298 continues across increasingly flat, wooded and undeveloped country to a four-way junction named Shepps Corners. Here, the route turns northeast once again, changing names to Minoa–Bridgeport Road as it enters Cicero.

Not far from the town line, all development along the road ceases as it enters the Cicero Swamp Wildlife Management Area, which covers part of a large, low-lying swamp known as Cicero Swamp. Homes begin to line the highway again just north of the marsh, where NY 298 makes a slight turn to the north as it begins to parallel Chittenango Creek, here forming the boundary between Onondaga County and Madison County. The waterway leads the highway into the commercialized hamlet of Oneida Park, where NY 298 ends at a roundabout intersection with NY 31. On the opposite bank of the creek is the slightly larger community of Bridgeport, located just east of Oneida Park on NY 31.

History
The portion of modern NY 298 from Salina Street (US 11) in downtown Syracuse to NY 31 near Bridgeport was originally designated as the northernmost portion of NY 91 as part of the 1930 renumbering of state highways in New York. At the time, NY 91 was routed on a then-complete Court Street and Collamer Road between Midler Avenue and Molloy Road. NY 91 was truncated to the intersection of US 11 and NY 173 south of Syracuse . Its former routing from the former northern terminus of its overlap with US 11 to Bridgeport was redesignated as NY 298.

In the 1950s, NY 298 was altered between Midler Avenue and Molloy Road to follow its modern alignment. As part of the rerouting, two traffic circles—the Carrier Circle at the intersection with Thompson Road and the New York State Thruway, and Military Circle at Townline Road—were installed along the route. By 1962, NY 298 had been extended southwestward to its current terminus at I-690 exit 9. At the time, traffic on I-690 flowed directly onto NY 298 and vice versa as the remainder of I-690 east of the interchange had yet to be built. I-690 was completed from NY 298 to Midler Avenue in the mid-1960s.

Major intersections

See also

References

External links

298
Transportation in Onondaga County, New York
Transportation in Syracuse, New York